Parametaria dupontii, the Dupont's dove shell or false cone, is a species of sea snail, a marine gastropod mollusk in the family Columbellidae, the dove snails.

Description

Distribution
This species can be found in Gulf of California and in Pacific Mexico.

References

Columbellidae
Gastropods described in 1845